Wu Jianchang (2 June 1939 – 19 November 2018) was a Chinese materials engineer, metallurgist, and politician who served as vice-minister of Metallurgical Industry in the 1990s.

Biography
Born in June 1939, Wu graduated from the University of South China. He was an engineer in the General Research Institute for Nonferrous Metals from September 1964 to April 1984. Wu joined the newly established China Non-ferrous Metals Industry Corporation in 1984, becoming vice-general manager in April 1984 and general manager in August 1994. He was vice-minister of Metallurgical Industry between December 1997 and March 1998. He was vice-president of China Iron and Steel Industry Association (CISA) in 1999, and held that office until April 2011. He became honorary president of China Non-ferrous Metals Industry Association in April 2011, and served until his death.

Personal life
In 1973 Wu married Deng Lin, the eldest daughter of Deng Xiaoping. Their son, Wu Mengmeng, was born in 1974.

References

1939 births
2018 deaths
Chinese metallurgists
Chinese Communist Party politicians from Hunan
Engineers from Hunan
People's Republic of China politicians from Hunan
University of South China alumni